Air Vice Marshal Alan David "Peter" Gillmore,  (17 October 1905 – 27 May 1996) was a Royal Air Force officer who served as Commandant of the RAF Staff College, Bracknell.

RAF career
Gillmore graduated from the RAF College Cranwell in 1925. He became a flight commander first with No. 201 Squadron in early 1935 and then with No. 202 Squadron later in the year. He served in the Second World War on the staff in the Directorate of Plans at the Air Ministry before becoming Station Commander at RAF Wick in 1943, Director of Operations (Maritime) in 1944 and Air Officer Commanding at Air Headquarters West Africa in 1945. After the war he became Director of Postings at the Air Ministry in 1946, Air Officer Commanding No. 64 Group in 1948 and Commandant of the RAF Staff College, Bracknell in 1951. His last postings were as Senior Air Staff Officer, Far East Air Force in 1953 and then as Senior Air Staff Officer, Home Command in 1956 before retiring in 1959.

Family
In 1931 Gillmore married Kathleen Morris; they had three sons.

References

1905 births
1996 deaths
Commanders of the Order of the British Empire
Companions of the Order of the Bath
Royal Air Force air marshals
Royal Air Force personnel of World War II